Chandana Mazumdar is a Bangladeshi folk singer of the Lalon Geeti genre. She won the Bangladesh National Film Award for Best Female Playback Singer for her performance in the film Monpura (2009).

Early life and career
Mazumdar was born in Kumarkhali in Kushtia District to Nirmal Chandra Majumdar. She first took lessons from her father and later from the Nazrul singer Yakub Ali Khan and the Lalon singer Moksed Ali Shai.

Mazumdar was employed as a singer with Bangladesh Television in 1979 and Bangladesh Betar in 1980.

Mazumdar sang a song for the unreleased film Felani in 2013.

Discography
 Bosonto Batashe 
 Tomar Aupar Neeley
 Chokh Gelo Pakhi Re

Personal life
Mazumdar has been married to the folk singer Kiron Chandra Roy since 1979. Together they have a daughter.

References

External links
 

Living people
People from Kushtia District
21st-century Bangladeshi women singers
21st-century Bangladeshi singers
Bangladeshi Hindus
20th-century Bangladeshi women singers
20th-century Bangladeshi singers
Bangladeshi folk singers
Bangladeshi playback singers
Best Female Playback Singer National Film Award (Bangladesh) winners
Year of birth missing (living people)